Big Girl's Blouse was an Australian skit program that aired in the mid-1990s on the Seven Network. The show was created by Gina Riley, Jane Turner and Magda Szubanski who all went on to star in Kath & Kim. There were four one-hour episodes, plus the pilot, which are usually shown as eight half-hour episodes. The phrase "Big Girl's Blouse" is a British English idiom meaning "ineffectual or weak, someone failing to show masculine strength or determination."

Reruns 
In Australia, it periodically airs on The Comedy Channel. In America it occasionally appears on the Sundance Channel.

DVD release 
The show was released in its entirety by Shock DVD in Australia on 17 October 2003.

References

External links
Big Girl's Blouse at the National Film and Sound Archive

1994 Australian television series debuts
1995 Australian television series endings
Australian television sketch shows
Seven Network original programming